Wesley J. Wildman (born 1961) is a contemporary Australian-American philosopher, theologian, and ethicist. Currently, he is a full professor at the Boston University School of Theology, founding member of the faculty of Computing and Data Sciences, and convener of the Religion and Science doctoral program in Boston University's Graduate School. He is executive director of The Center for Mind and Culture, founding co-director of the Institute for the Biocultural Study of Religion, and founding co-editor of the journal Religion, Brain & Behavior (published by Taylor & Francis). Wildman's academic work has focused on interpreting religion and building theories of religious beliefs, behaviours, and experiences that acknowledge value in longstanding traditions while attempting to remain intellectually viable in light of the biological, cognitive, evolutionary, physical, and social sciences. He is an important figure in the religion and science field, along with scholars such as Robert John Russell, Nancey Murphy, and John Polkinghorne.

Background
Wesley Wildman was born in Adelaide, South Australia, in 1961. He studied mathematics, computer science, and physics at Flinders University, receiving a Bachelor of Arts degree in 1980 and a first-class honours degree in pure mathematics in 1981. After studying divinity at the University of Sydney, he earned a PhD in philosophical theology and the philosophy of religion from the Graduate Theological Union in Berkeley, California, in 1993, at which point he took his current position at Boston University. Currently, he lives in suburban Boston.

Career
Wildman's work initially focused on one religious tradition, Christianity, especially its beliefs. His first book, Fidelity with Plausibility (1998), analysed the plausibility of central Christian beliefs in the context of the contemporary physical and human sciences and the history of encounter with the other religions. Since then, Wildman's philosophical and theological goals have broadened as he has attempted to interpret religion as a social, cultural, and evolutionary phenomenon. This broadening has included a longstanding interest in the comparative study of world religious traditions and involvement in a series of publications on interdisciplinary methodology and practice spanning the humanities and sciences as they relate to religion.

The definitive expression of Wildman's philosophy is his six-volume Religious Philosophy series. The first volume, Religious Philosophy as Multidisciplinary Comparative Inquiry, outlines a program for revitalizing the philosophy of religion by making it consistently comparative—attending to all human religions rather than advocating on behalf of one favoured tradition—and massively multidisciplinary, drawing insights from the scientific, social scientific, and humanistic inquiries that bear upon questions in philosophy of religion. Volume two, In Our Own Image, provides a systematic comparative analysis of the relative strengths and weaknesses of three classes of ultimacy models: agential-being models that conceive God as a person with intentions and agency, subordinate-deity models like process theism that conceive God as less than ultimate, and ground-of-being models that eschew theological anthropomorphism and identify God with nature's valuational depths. Not yet published, the third volume, Science and Ultimate Reality, will continue the second volume's reverent competition between ultimacy models, now focusing on how fundamental physics and biology differentially impact the plausibility of these three ultimacy models. Volume four, Science and Religious Anthropology, considers the impact of contemporary physics and biology upon different religious conceptions of the human person and argues for a religious naturalist theological anthropology that affirms the reality, meaningfulness, and supreme value of human religious quests, while denying that supernatural entities are needed to understand human religiousness. The fifth volume, Religious and Spiritual Experiences, interprets religious and spiritual experiences as intense and profoundly meaningful yet naturalistically grounded in brains and bodies and capable of being enhanced and controlled with a variety of technologies, old and new. Volume six, Effing the Ineffable, explores how we use religious language to make sense of the most profound aspects of human experience and to plumb the mystical depths of reality, conceiving the inconceivable and saying the unsayable.

Along with neurologist Patrick McNamara, also at Boston University, Wildman founded the Institute for the Biocultural Study of Religion, an independent scientific research institute that pursues research and public outreach on the scientific study of religious phenomena. In 2011, the Institute began publication of Religion, Brain, & Behavior, a peer-reviewed academic journal whose advisory board includes such figures as philosopher Daniel Dennett, religion scholar Ann Taves, sociologist of religion Nancy Ammerman, and many of the leading figures in the scientific study of religion and the cognitive science of religion. In 2016, Wildman founded The Center for Mind and Culture, a non-profit research institute that uses computer modelling and data analytics to tackle complex social problems such as child trafficking, religious radicalization, proliferation of weapons of mass destruction, social integration of immigrants and refugees, and many other critical issues arising out of the “mind-culture nexus.”

Wildman is also known for pastoral research into ideological differences in Christian denominations, particularly the meaning of the distinctions among liberal, evangelical, and moderate Protestants in the United States. His work has been influenced by such figures as Protestant theologians Friedrich Schleiermacher and Paul Tillich, comparative religion scholar Huston Smith, and philosophers John Searle and Robert Neville.

Wildman is a founding member of the International Society for Science and Religion, and a longtime member of the American Theological Society, the American Academy of Religion, and the American Association for the Advancement of Science.

Selected publications
 Religion and Science: History, Method, Dialogue, ed. with W. Mark Richardson (New York: Routledge, Inc., 1996)
 Fidelity with Plausibility: Modest Christologies in the Twentieth Century (Albany: SUNY Press, 1998)
 Encyclopedia of Science and Religion, 2 vols., edited with Niels Gregersen and Nancy Howell, Chief Editor, Wentzel van Huyssteen (New York: Macmillan Reference, 2003)
 Lost in the Middle? Claiming an Inclusive Faith for Christians Who Are Both Liberal and Evangelical (Alban Institute, 2009)
 Found in the Middle! Theology and Ethics for Christians Who Are Both Liberal and Evangelical (Alban Institute, 2009)
 Science and Religious Anthropology: A Spiritually Evocative Naturalist Interpretation of Human Life (Aldershot, UK: Ashgate, 2009)
 Religious Philosophy as Multidisciplinary Comparative Inquiry: Envisioning a Future for the Philosophy of Religion (Albany: State University of New York Press, 2010)
 Religious and Spiritual Experiences (Cambridge: Cambridge University Press, 2011)
 Science and the World’s Religions, 3 vols., edited with Patrick McNamara (Praeger, 2012)
 In Our Own Image: Anthropomorphism, Apophaticism, and Ultimacy (Oxford: Oxford University Press, 2017)
 Effing the Ineffable: Existential Mumblings at the Limits of Language (Albany, NY: State University of New York Press, 2018)
 God is ... Meditations on the Mystery of Life, the Purity of Grace, the Bliss of Surrender, and the God Beyond God (Eugene, OR: Wipf and Stock, 2019)
Spirit Tech: The Brave New World of Consciousness Hacking and Enlightenment Engineering (St. Martin's Press, 2021)

References

External links
 
 mindandculture.org
 ibcsr.org
 ScienceOnReligion.org
 LiberalEvangelical.org
 Weird Wild Web
 Religion & Science PhD Home page
 Science on Religion at Patheos.com

1961 births
American theologians
Australian Christian theologians
Australian emigrants to the United States
Living people
People from Adelaide
Boston University School of Theology faculty
University of Sydney alumni
Flinders University alumni
Graduate Theological Union alumni
American male writers
Australian male writers
Uniting Church in Australia ministers